Meispelt is a small town in the commune of Kehlen, in western Luxembourg.  , the town had a population of 255.

References 

Kehlen
Towns in Luxembourg